Agiloft, Inc. is a technology company specializing in contract lifecycle management and business process management software in Redwood City, California. It was originally founded in October 1990 as Integral Solutions Corporation by Colin Earl.

History
Agiloft started as Integral Solutions Corporation founded by Colin Earl in 1990. The company worked on development projects for other corporations until developing its own software in 1996 called SupportWizard. SupportWizard was designed as a help desk application and by 1999 officially supported MySQL. Integral Solutions continued to build on this application adding call center and CRM functionality. For a time the company was known by the name of the SupportWizard software. 

In 2003, they announced a new revision of the software operating on J2EE framework called Enterprise Wizard. 

By 2007 the company offered a platform version of the software, called SaaSWizard, on which users could automate business actions through their own customization. Development continued on the EnterpriseWizard application operating on top of the platform allowing users to customize the program through a web interface. Colin Earl changed both the business and software name to Agiloft in 2012. 

In 2017, Earl spoke out against the proposed H1-B reforms and stated that one of his workers, "in all likelihood, not getting his visa renewed and will return to China."

Software
Agiloft is a low-code development platform that has prebuilt modules that focus on contract management and IT service management. The platform is configured via a web-browser with dropdown menus and drag and drop tools to configure functions or build new applications. The contract management portion of the software allows for the automation of creation, workflow, and renewal of contracts which has been used in the healthcare field. This software has won PC Magazine's Editor's Choice award for several years.

See also

Project management
Cloud computing

References

External links

Companies based in Redwood City, California
Cloud applications
Document management systems
Software companies established in 1990
Software companies based in California
Workflow technology
Software companies of the United States